Gary Worthan (born January 11, 1954) is the Iowa State Representative from the 11th District. He has served in the Iowa House of Representatives since 2007, having won a December 13, 2006 special election to replace the deceased Mary Lou Freeman, who had run unopposed in the general election.  Smith was born and lives in Storm Lake, Iowa.  He has an A.A. in farm operations from Iowa State University.

, Worthan serves on several committees in the Iowa House – the Appropriations committee, the Judiciary committee, the Public Safety committee, and the Veterans Affairs committee.  He also serves as chair of the Justice System Appropriations Subcommittee.

In 2018, he was instrumental in killing a pilot program that aimed to limit the number of people awaiting trial in jail because they cannot afford bail. Worthan was chairman of the subcommittee that oversaw the judicial budget; the editorial board of the Des Moines Register, which called the pilot program a "worthwhile experiment in criminal justice reform" criticized Worthan for scrapping the program only weeks before the end of a legislative session ("a time-honored method for legislators and lobbyists to try to slip provisions into law with little notice or public scrutiny"), and the lawmakers for protecting "special interests". On August 30, 2019 CNN reported that Josh Lederman , a co owner of Lederman Bail Bonds, had made significant donations to Worthan's Campaign, alongside donations to other Iowa Republicans.

In April 2019, Worthan proposed legislation that would curtail the powers of the Iowa Attorney General to limit the office's ability to take part in lawsuits. Tom Miller, the Democratic Attorney General, had joined six lawsuits against Trump administration policies, such as the family separation policy.

Electoral history

References

External links 

 Representative Gary Worthan official Iowa General Assembly site
 
 Financial information (state office) at the National Institute for Money in State Politics
 Profile at Iowa House Republicans

1954 births
Iowa State University alumni
Republican Party members of the Iowa House of Representatives
Living people
People from Storm Lake, Iowa
21st-century American politicians